Bigg Boss also known as BB is an Indian Tamil-language version of the reality TV program Bigg Boss. The program follows the Big Brother format developed by Endemol in the Netherlands. Over five years, Bigg Boss has rolled out six seasons and Kamal Haasan has continued as a host for six seasons and broadcast by Star Vijay and streamed on Disney+ Hotstar.

The first season and the launch of the franchise was premiered on 25 June 2017.

Overview
Bigg Boss Tamil is a reality show based on the original Dutch Big Brother format developed by John de Mol Jr. Unlike original Big Brother, Bigg Boss Tamil features celebrity and commoner contestants. The contestants (known as "housemates") live in a house that is isolated from the world. Following anonymous internal voting by the housemates and external voting by television audiences, one housemate is "evicted" (removed) from the house each week. During the final week, the final four or five housemates vote to determine the show's winner. The eponymous Bigg Boss character serves as an omnipresent authority figure and represents the show's producers. He often interacts with the housemates to assign challenges and ask questions.

Rules
Housemates are bound by various rules. For example, contestants must speak Tamil, may not tamper with objects in the house, may not leave the premises without permission, may not discuss the nomination process, may not sleep during the day, and may not commit violence against fellow housemates. Do not write in paper or written format.  The complete rules are not revealed to the audience.

Airing
Daily episodes present the main events of the previous day while weekend episodes focus on discussion of the main problems of the week and interviews with evicted contestants. On the Sunday episode the host announces the evicted contestant.

Eviction
Contestants are nominated for eviction each week by their housemates. Viewers cast their votes in favour of the contestants they would like to save from eviction. Each viewer is entitled to cast ten votes per day. The contestant with the fewest votes is out. Contestants who break the rules or who leave the house for medical reasons are evicted. During week 14 or 15 (before finale), Contestants get a option to be evicted from the game by their own decision by accepting the cash prize eviction and self evict themselves.

Broadcast 
Bigg Boss Tamil is aired on Star Vijay and also  available on Disney+ Hotstar. Everyday episodes contain the main happenings of the previous day. Every Sunday episode mainly focuses on an interview of an evicted contestant by the host. The unseen episode will be available as Bigg Boss Unseen on Vijay Music (sister channel to Star Vijay).

Series details 

 Male Winners
 Female Winners

Reception

Season 1
Bigg Boss Tamil programme is regarded as the most expensive Tamil television show. The season was a overall success and was stated as one of the best season so far of the Bigg Boss Tamil franchise and received a opening TRP of 15.15 TVR on the grand launch day and a low 14.25 TVR on the grand finale day.

Season 2
The launch of season 2 opened with 11.72 TVR which was impressive and welcoming for the franchise.  Overall this season was only seen as decent compared to its 1st season in the franchise it did not blow up major and received average reviews from critics. The TRP of 19.25 TVR for the grand finale was recorded as the highest ratings on charts for Bigg Boss Tamil till date for a grand finale episode.

Season 3
The launch of season 3 opened with 11.9 TVR, which is slightly bigger than the previous seasons. Overall this season emerged as a successful season getting positive response from both critics and general audience.   Season 3 is still regarded as the most popular season of Bigg Boss Tamil among general audience .

Season 4
The launch of season 4 opened with highest ever 20.61 TVR benefited from the impact of successful season 3 and broke records for viewership for Bigg Boss Tamil on a grand opening day, the ratings of the season 4 proved that the audience for Bigg Boss is getting bigger year by year. The season overall was a highly successful season receiving positive reviews from critics and audiences.

Season 5 
The launch of season 5 received TRP rating of 18.60 TVR . Season 5 was considered good and an overall success for the franchise. It received mixed to average reviews from critics and audience. The Grand Finale saw a TRP of 17.25 TVR	which is considered a success.

Season 6 
The launch of season 6 received a TRP rating of 18 71 TVR which is considered good and great viewership for a season premiere. Season 6 according to the franchise received mixed reviews to negative reviews from critics and viewers and TRP ratings slowly deteriorated as the season went by.

Bigg Boss Ultimate 

The series is also set to roll out a digital version of the show called Bigg Boss Ultimate which is also going to be hosted by Kamal Haasan and broadcast by Disney+ Hotstar for 24×5 coverage. The series was eventually hosted by Silambarasan after Haasan had to opt out due to scheduling conflicts with his latest release, Vikram.

Bigg Boss Fun Unlimited
Bigg Boss Fun Unlimited is an Indian Tamil-Indian language Reality Talk show with former housemates from the previous season of reality television series Bigg Boss Tamil. The show features former housemates talking about the present contestants in the current season, its aired on Disney+ Hotstar. However this show was only for Bigg Boss 2 and later discontinued from Bigg Boss 3.

Housemates pattern

Controversies

Notes

References

External links 

 Official Website at Hotstar

Star Vijay original programming
Tamil-language reality television series
Tamil-language game shows
Tamil-language comedy television series
2010s Tamil-language television series
2017 Tamil-language television series debuts
Tamil-language television shows
 
Kamal Haasan
Indian television series based on non-Indian television series
Indian reality television series
Indian television series